Litsea ovalifolia is a species of plant in the family Lauraceae. It is endemic to Sri Lanka.

References

External links
 http://plants.jstor.org/specimen/k000793234

ovalifolia
Endemic flora of Sri Lanka